David Ong Kim Huat (born 19 May 1961) is a Singaporean former politician who has served as a Member of Parliament (MP) for Jurong Group Representation Constituency (GRC) (Bukit Batok), Adviser to Jurong GRC Grassroots Organisations (GROs) and Chairman of the Jurong Town Council since 2011. He resigned from his MP position  on 12 March 2016 citing personal reasons in a letter which is published by Prime Minister Lee Hsien Loong.

Early life and education
Ong was born in Singapore on 19 May 1961, to a police officer and his wife, a homemaker. He grew up in a small housing flat in Queenstown and attended Margaret Drive Primary School and Gan Eng Seng School. Ong graduated from Tanjong Katong Secondary Technical School in 1979, going on to obtain a degree from the University of Oregon in 1986.

Career
Ong began his professional career in 1986 at CL Computers, which he left in 1989 to join American Express. In 1992, Ong crossed over to Visa International, followed by Reed Elsevier in 1995, and Planet Marketing in 1997, where he stayed on till 2007. From 2001 to 2007, Ong also worked at Publicis Groupe.

Ong started RedDot Publishing Inc. which specializes in providing media solutions for the tourism industry. He was Regional Marketing Director for Visa International before he founded an integrated marketing consultancy agency which was acquired by Publicis Groupe in 2002. 

Since 2007, he has been serving as RedDot Publishing's Managing Director. He is also the Patron of the Singapore Brain Tumor Society and Advisor to Singapore Eng Choon Clan.

Politics

Since 1999, Ong served as a grassroots leader in Kreta Ayer–Kim Seng Division. He was the Chairman of its Citizens’ Consultative Committee from 2005 to 2011. Ong was appointed a District Councillor of the Central Singapore Community Development Council (CDC) in 2004. He chaired the CDC’s Networks Committee that is responsible for fostering deeper collaboration with stakeholders to better meet the community’s needs. Between 2006 and 2010, Ong was a member of the REACH Supervisory Panel. In January 2010, he was appointed Chairman of People’s Association Active Ageing Council. He was also a member of the ITE College Central Advisory Committee. Ong was also the Vice Chairman of the Government Parliamentary Committee (GPC) for Culture, Community and Youth and Member of the GPC for Communication and Information. Ong was also the Vice Chairman of Southwest Community Development Council and President of Basketball Association of Singapore. He is a Member of PAP Community Foundation Executive Committee as well as the National Trade Union Congress U-Care Fund Board of Trustees.

A former member of the Singapore-based political party People's Action Party (PAP) till his abrupt resignation from both party and parliament on 12 March 2016, Ong served previously as a Member of Parliament for the Jurong GRC, as well as the Chairman of the Jurong Town Council. Ong was the Vice Chairman of Ministry of Culture, Community, and Youth (MCCY)'s Government Parliamentary Committee (GPC) as well a member of the Ministry of Communications and Information (MCI) GPC.

Ong's sudden retirement on 12 March 2016 from politics as an incumbent People's Action Party Member of Parliament triggered the Bukit Batok by-election which took place on 7 May 2016. The explanation offered by the Singapore media is that Ong has been having an extra marital affair with 41 year-old, Wendy Lim, who is also a member and grassroots volunteer of the People's Action Party. Ong's alleged affair went on over nearly six months before it went public after the husband of Lim lodged a complaint about it.

Personal life
Ong is married with three children.

See also
 List of Singapore MPs

References

1961 births
University of Oregon alumni
Living people
Members of the Parliament of Singapore
Singaporean Christians
Singaporean people of Hokkien descent